Attje Harma Kuiken (born 27 October 1977) is a Dutch politician and former civil servant serving as the leader of the Labour Party in the House of Representatives since 22 April 2022. She has been a parliamentarian since 30 November 2006 with a brief interruption in 2010.

Early life and education 
Attje Harma Kuiken was born on 27 October 1977 in Groningen. She grew up in Hoogezand-Sappemeer and from the age of ten in Ferwert. She did the vwo program at the Dockinga College, a high school in Dokkum, from 1990 to 1996.

Kuiken studied public administration at the NHL University of Applied Sciences in Leeuwarden from 1996 to 1999 and organization science at the Tilburg University from 2000 to 2006. During her second studies, she lived in Breda.

Politics 
Kuiken has been a member of the Labour Party since 2002. She founded a local chapter of the Young Socialists, the youth organisation of the Labour Party, in Breda. She was a member of the House of Representatives from 30 November 2006 until 19 January 2010. She then went on maternity leave and was temporarily replaced by Saskia Laaper. Kuiken has been a member of the House of Representatives again since 11 May 2010.

After fellow Labour member Martijn van Dam was appointed State Secretary for Economic Affairs in November 2015, Kuiken was elected vice parliamentary group leader. After the resignation of Diederik Samsom as parliamentary leader on 12 December 2016, Kuiken succeeded him.

After the resignation of Lilianne Ploumen, she again was elected parliamentary leader on 22 April 2022.

References

External links 

  Attje Kuiken at the House of Representatives website
  Attje Kuiken at the Labour Party website

1977 births
Living people
21st-century Dutch civil servants
21st-century Dutch politicians
21st-century Dutch women politicians
Labour Party (Netherlands) politicians
Members of the House of Representatives (Netherlands)
Politicians from Groningen (city)
Tilburg University alumni
20th-century Dutch women